Major (retd) Habibullah Khan Tarin (born 1947) is a former Pakistan Army officer, a Member of Provincial Assembly and a former Speaker of the Khyber Pakhtunkhwa Assembly.

He belongs to the Tarin (or Tareen) tribe of Haripur District, Hazara, Pakistan and is settled in Darwesh village .

Khan did not take part in various elections, due to corruption charges against him in different schemes, and later while making his return into politics was disqualified in 2008 elections over Fake Degree, and currently still khan doesn't hold any government office. He is currently in PML N and his son is expected to contest in his place in coming years from his constituency pk40 haripur.

References

Living people
1947 births
People from Haripur District
Pakistani politicians